A pen name, also called a nom de plume or a literary double, is a pseudonym (or, in some cases, a variant form of a real name) adopted by an author and printed on the title page or by-line of their works in place of their real name. 

A pen name may be used to make the author's name more distinctive, to disguise the author's gender, to distance the author from their other works, to protect the author from retribution for their writings, to merge multiple persons into a single identifiable author, or for any of a number of reasons related to the marketing or aesthetic presentation of the work.

The author's real identity may be known only to the publisher or may become common knowledge.

Etymology
The French-language phrase  is occasionally still seen as a synonym for the English term "pen name", which is a "back-translation" and originated in England rather than France. H. W. Fowler and F. G. Fowler, in The King's English, state that the term nom de plume evolved in Britain, where people wanting a literary phrase failed to understand the term nom de guerre, which already existed in French. Since  means "war" in French,  did not make sense to the British, who did not understand the French metaphor. See also French phrases used by English speakers.

Western literature

Europe and the United States
An author may use a pen name if their real name is likely to be confused with that of another author or other significant individual. For instance, in 1899 the British politician Winston Churchill wrote under the name Winston S. Churchill to distinguish his writings from those of the American novelist of the same name.

An author may use a pen name implying a rank or title which they have never actually held. William Earl Johns wrote under the name "Capt. W. E. Johns" although the highest army rank he held was acting lieutenant and his highest air force rank was flying officer. 

Authors who regularly write in more than one genre may use different pen names for each, either with no attempt to conceal a true identity or even after their identity is known. Romance writer Nora Roberts writes erotic thrillers under the pen name J. D. Robb (such books were originally listed as by "J. D. Robb" and are now titled "Nora Roberts writing as J. D. Robb"); Scots writer Iain Banks wrote mainstream or literary fiction under his own name and science fiction under Iain M. Banks; Samuel Langhorne Clemens used the aliases Mark Twain and Sieur Louis de Conte for different works. Similarly, an author who writes both fiction and non-fiction (such as the mathematician and fantasy writer Charles Dodgson, who wrote as Lewis Carroll) may use a pseudonym for fiction writing. Science fiction author Harry Turtledove has used the name H. N. Turtletaub for a number of historical novels he has written because he and his publisher felt that the presumed lower sales of those novels might hurt book store orders for the novels he writes under his own name.

Occasionally, a pen name is employed to avoid overexposure. Prolific authors for pulp magazines often had two and sometimes three short stories appearing in one issue of a magazine; the editor would create several fictitious author names to hide this from readers. Robert A. Heinlein wrote stories under pseudonyms of Anson MacDonald (a combination of his middle name and his then wife's maiden name) and Caleb Strong so that more of his works could be published in a single magazine. Stephen King published four novels under the name Richard Bachman because publishers did not feel the public would buy more than one novel per year from a single author. Eventually, after critics found a large number of style similarities, publishers revealed Bachman's true identity.

Sometimes a pen name is used because an author believes that their name does not suit the genre they are writing in. Western novelist Pearl Gray dropped his first name and changed the spelling of his last name to become Zane Grey because he believed that his real name did not suit the Western genre. Romance novelist Angela Knight writes under that name instead of her actual name (Julie Woodcock) because of the double entendre of her surname in the context of that genre. Romain Gary, who was a well-known French writer, decided in 1973 to write novels in a different style under the name Émile Ajar and even asked his cousin's son to impersonate Ajar; thus he received the most prestigious French literary prize twice, which is forbidden by the prize rules. He revealed the affair in a book he sent his editor just before committing suicide in 1980.

Some pen names have been used for long periods, even decades, without the author's true identity being discovered, such as Elena Ferrante and Torsten Krol.

A pen name may be shared by different writers in order to suggest continuity of authorship. Thus the Bessie Bunter series of English boarding-school stories, initially written by the prolific Charles Hamilton under the name Hilda Richards, was taken on by other authors who continued to use the same pen-name.

In some forms of fiction, the pen name adopted is the name of the lead character, to suggest to the reader that the book is an autobiography of a real person. Daniel Handler used the pseudonym Lemony Snicket to present his A Series of Unfortunate Events books as memoirs by an acquaintance of the main characters. Some, however, do this to fit a certain theme. One example, Pseudonymous Bosch, used his pen name just to expand the theme of secrecy in The Secret Series.

Authors also may occasionally choose pen names to appear in more favorable positions in bookshops or libraries, to maximize visibility when placed on shelves that are conventionally arranged alphabetically moving horizontally, then upwards vertically.

Female authors
Some female authors have used pen names to ensure that their works were accepted by publishers and/or the public. Such is the case of Peru's Clarinda, whose work was published in the early 17th century. More often, women have adopted masculine pen names. This was common in the 19th century, when women were beginning to make inroads into literature but, it was felt, would not be taken as seriously by readers as male authors. For example, Mary Ann Evans wrote under the pen name George Eliot; and Amandine Aurore Lucile Dupin, Baronne Dudevant, used the pseudonym George Sand.  Charlotte, Emily and Anne Brontë published under the names Currer, Ellis, and Acton Bell, respectively. French-Savoyard writer and poet Amélie Gex chose to publish as Dian de Jeânna ("John, son of Jane") during the first half of her career. Karen Blixen's very successful Out of Africa (1937) was originally published under the pen name Isak Dinesen. Victoria Benedictsson, a Swedish author of the 19th century, wrote under the name Ernst Ahlgren. The science fiction author Alice B. Sheldon for many years published under the masculine name of James Tiptree, Jr., the discovery of which led to a deep discussion of gender in the genre.  

More recently, women who write in genres commonly written by men sometimes choose to use initials, such as K. A. Applegate, C. J. Cherryh, P. N. Elrod, D. C. Fontana, S. E. Hinton, G. A. Riplinger, J. D. Robb, and J. K. Rowling. Alternatively, they may use a unisex pen name, such as Robin Hobb (the second pen name of novelist Margaret Astrid Lindholm Ogden).

Collective names
A collective name, also known as a house name, is sometimes used with series fiction published under one pen name even though more than one author may have contributed to the series. In some cases the first books in the series were written by one writer, but subsequent books were written by ghostwriters. For instance, many of the later books in The Saint adventure series were not written by Leslie Charteris, the series' originator.  Similarly, Nancy Drew mystery books are published as though they were written by Carolyn Keene, The Hardy Boys books are published as the work of Franklin W. Dixon, and The Bobbsey Twins series are credited to Laura Lee Hope, although numerous authors have been involved in each series. Erin Hunter, author of the Warriors novel series, is actually a collective pen name used by authors Kate Cary, Cherith Baldry, Tui T. Sutherland, and the editor Victoria Holmes.

Collaborative authors may also have their works published under a single pen name. Frederic Dannay and Manfred B. Lee published their mystery novels and stories under the pen name Ellery Queen, as well as publishing the work of ghostwriters under the same name. The writers of Atlanta Nights, a deliberately bad book intended to embarrass the publishing firm PublishAmerica, used the pen name Travis Tea. Additionally, the credited author of The Expanse, James S.A. Corey, is an amalgam of the middle names of collaborating writers Daniel Abraham and Ty Franck respectively, while S.A. are the initials of Abraham's daughter. Sometimes multiple authors will write related books under the same pseudonym; examples include T. H. Lain in fiction. The Australian fiction collaborators who write under the pen name Alice Campion are a group of women who have so far written The Painted Sky (2015), Der Bunte Himmel (2015), and The Shifting Light (2017).

In the 1780s, The Federalist Papers were written under the pseudonym "Publius" by Alexander Hamilton, James Madison, and John Jay. The three men chose the name "Publius" because it recalled the founder of the Roman Republic and using it implied a positive intention.

In pure mathematics, Nicolas Bourbaki is the pseudonym of a group of mostly French-connected mathematicians attempting to expose the field in an axiomatic and self-contained, encyclopedic form.

Concealment of identity
A pseudonym may be used to protect the writer of exposé books about espionage or crime.  Former SAS soldier Steven Billy Mitchell used the pseudonym Andy McNab for his book about a failed SAS mission titled Bravo Two Zero. The name Ibn Warraq ("son of a papermaker") has been used by dissident Muslim authors. Author Brian O'Nolan used the pen names Flann O'Brien and Myles na gCopaleen for his novels and journalistic writing from the 1940s to the 1960s because Irish civil servants were not permitted at that time to publish political writings. The identity of the enigmatic twentieth-century novelist B. Traven has never been conclusively revealed, despite thorough research.

A multiple-use name or anonymity pseudonym is a pseudonym open for anyone to use and these have been adopted by various groups, often as a protest against the cult of individual creators. In Italy, two anonymous groups of writers have gained some popularity with the collective names of Luther Blissett and Wu Ming.

Eastern literature

India

In Indian languages, writers may put a pen name at the end of their names, like Ramdhari Singh Dinkar. Some writers, like Firaq Gorakhpuri, wrote only under a pen name.

In early Indian literature, authors considered the use of names egotistical. Because names were avoided, it is difficult to trace the authorship of many earlier literary works from India. Later writers adopted the practice of using the name of their deity of worship or Guru's name as their pen name. In this case, typically the pen name would be included at the end of the prose or poetry.

Composers of Indian classical music used pen names in compositions to assert authorship, including Sadarang, Gunarang (Fayyaz Ahmed Khan), Ada Rang (court musician of Muhammad Shah), Sabrang (Bade Ghulam Ali Khan), and Ramrang (Ramashreya Jha). Other compositions are apocryphally ascribed to composers with their pen names.

Hong Kong
Wuxia novelist Louis Cha uses the pen name Gum Yoong (金庸) by taking apart the components of the Chinese character in his given name (鏞) from his birth name Cha Leung-yung (查良鏞).

Japan
Japanese poets who write haiku often use a haigō (俳号). The haiku poet Matsuo Bashō had used two other haigō before he became fond of a banana plant (bashō) that had been given to him by a disciple and started using it as his pen name at the age of 36.

Similar to a pen name, Japanese artists usually have a gō or art-name, which might change a number of times during their career. In some cases, artists adopted different gō at different stages of their career, usually to mark significant changes in their life. One of the most extreme examples of this is Hokusai, who in the period 1798 to 1806 alone used no fewer than six. Manga artist Ogure Ito uses the pen name Oh! great because his real name Ogure Ito is roughly how the Japanese pronounce "oh great".

Persian and Urdu poetry

Note: List of Urdu language poets provides pen names for a range of Urdu poets.
A shâ'er (Persian from Arabic, for poet) (a poet who writes she'rs in Urdu or Persian) almost always has a "takhallus", a pen name, traditionally placed at the end of the name (often marked by a graphical sign  placed above it) when referring to the poet by his full name. For example, Hafez is a pen-name for Shams al-Din, and thus the usual way to refer to him would be Shams al-Din Hafez or just Hafez. Mirza Asadullah Baig Khan (his official name and title) is referred to as Mirza Asadullah Khan Ghalib, or just Mirza Ghalib.

See also
Art name
Courtesy name
List of pen names
List of pseudonyms
Nom de guerre
Pseudepigrapha
Ring name – the equivalent concept among professional wrestlers
Stage name – the equivalent concept among performers
Slave name

Notes

References

Further reading

 

Pen name